Kepler-93b is a Super-Earth exoplanet whose diameter is estimated to be around 18,800 km (11,700 miles). The discovery was announced in 2014.

Sources 
https://www.nasa.gov/jpl/spitzer/kepler/precise-measurement-alien-world-20140723
https://exoplanets.nasa.gov/exoplanet-catalog/1309/kepler-93-b/

Super-Earths
Exoplanets discovered in 2014
Exoplanets discovered by the Kepler space telescope